Gu Hyeon-suk (born 28 May 1969) is a South Korean judoka. She competed in the women's half-middleweight event at the 1992 Summer Olympics at the age of 23.

References

1969 births
Living people
South Korean female judoka
Olympic judoka of South Korea
Judoka at the 1992 Summer Olympics
Place of birth missing (living people)